Margaret Killjoy is an American author and musician. She has published fiction novels in the steampunk and folk horror genres, and is best known for her two-book Danielle Cain series. Killjoy is involved in several musical projects across genres including black metal, neofolk, and electronica. She founded the feminist black metal band Feminazgûl in 2018.

Life 
Killjoy is an anarchist, feminist, and anti-fascist. She is a transgender woman. Killjoy spent much of her early adult life as a "squatter and wanderer", then in the late 2010s began building a small cabin in the Appalachian Mountains on an anarchist land project.

Career

Writing 
Killjoy's fiction writing includes queer anarchist steampunk and folk horror. Killjoy published What Lies Beneath the Clock Tower, a steampunk interactive novel, in 2011. In 2017, Killjoy published the first of two books in the Danielle Cain series, which features a group of genderqueer, anarchist demon hunters in the American heartland. In the first novella, The Lamb Will Slaughter the Lion, the group is hunted by a demon that appears in the form of a stag. The second book in the series, The Barrow Will Send What It May, follows members of the same group as they run from the events of the first book. The Lamb Will Slaughter the Lion was nominated for a Shirley Jackson Award in 2017. The Barrow Will Send What It May was nominated in the 31st Lambda Literary Awards in the LGBTQ science fiction and fantasy category. Killjoy contributed the short story "We Won't Be Here Tomorrow" to A Punk Rock Future, a 2019 anthology of speculative science fiction and fantasy.

Killjoy has also edited and written non-fiction works, including the 2009 book Mythmakers & Lawbreakers: Anarchist Writers on Fiction, a collection of interviews with anarchist authors including Ursula K. Le Guin and Alan Moore. She also was an editor of SteamPunk Magazine, which was in print from 2007 to 2016.

Music 
Killjoy founded the feminist black metal band Feminazgûl in 2018. She released the band's first EP, The Age of Men Is Over, as a solo project the same year. Joined by Laura Beach as lead vocalist and Meredith Yayanos as violinist and theremin player, the band released its first full-length album, No Dawn for Men, in 2020.

Killjoy is involved in several other musical projects: neofolk Alsarath, blackened doom Vulgarite, and electronica Nomadic War Machine.

Podcasting 
Killjoy hosts the anarchist survivalist podcast Live Like the World Is Dying and launched her new podcast Cool People Who Did Cool Stuff on May 2, 2022.

Written works

Fiction books 

 What Lies Beneath the Clock Tower (2011)
 The Super-Happy Anarcho Fun Book (2013)
 A Country of Ghosts (2014)
 The Lamb Will Slaughter the Lion (Danielle Cain series #1, 2017)
 The Barrow Will Send What It May (Danielle Cain series #2, 2018)

Non-fiction 

 Mythmakers & Lawbreakers: Anarchists Writers on Fiction (editor, 2009)
 A Steampunk's Guide to the Apocalypse (2012)
 We Are Many: Reflections on Movement Strategy from Occupation to Liberation (editor, 2012)
 Take What You Need and Compost the Rest: An Anarchist Introduction to Post-Civilization Theory (2013)

Discography

Alsarath 

 Come to Daggers (2020)

Feminazgûl 

 The Age of Men Is Over (EP, 2018)
 No Dawn for Men (2020)

Nomadic War Machine 

 I have a gun. Give me all the money in the register. (2010)
 Always /// Forever (2018)
 Every Breath Our Last (2019)
 Creatures of the Wind (2020)
 Are We Not Monsters (2020)

Vulgarite 

 Fear Not the Dark Nor the Sun's Return (2020)

References

External links 
 

21st-century American musicians
21st-century American women singers
21st-century American singers
21st-century American women writers
American anarchists
American anti-fascists
American horror writers
American podcasters
American women writers
Anarchist writers
Black metal musicians
Electronica musicians
Feminist musicians
Living people
Singers from North Carolina
Steampunk writers
Transgender women musicians
Writers from North Carolina
Year of birth missing (living people)
American women podcasters
Women in metal
20th-century squatters
Transgender singers
American transgender writers